Makhan Nagar (Hindi: माखन नगर), is a town and a Nagar Panchayat in Narmadapuram district  in the state of Madhya Pradesh, India. It is the birthplace of the noted Hindi poet Makhanlal Chaturvedi. It is also famous for its shrine of Lord Hanuman, whose idol is said to have come from a Baodi stepwell beside the shrine.

Other places include the Ram Janki temple which is a Hindu temple of Lord Ram in Dravidian architecture, and the Babai Farm, a farm of Mangoes, Jackfruit, etc. and is also famous for the Tridevi temple.

Demographics

Geography

Notable people
 Makhanlal Chaturvedi, Hindi Poet

See also
Narmadapuram district

References

Cities and towns in Madhya Pradesh